The Yellow Dog (French:Le Chien jaune) is a 1932 French crime film directed by Jean Tarride and starring Abel Tarride, Rosine Deréan and Rolla Norman. It is an adaptation of the novel Maigret and the Yellow Dog by the Belgian writer Georges Simenon. Abel Tarride was the director's father.

Cast
 Abel Tarride : Commissaire Maigret
 Rosine Deréan : Emma
 Rolla Norman : Léon
 Robert Le Vigan : Le docteur Ernest Michoux
 Jacques Henley : Le Pommeret
 Anthony Gildès : Le pharmacien
 Robert Lepers : L'inspecteur
 Jean Gobet : Le voyageur de commerce
 Paul Azaïs : Le marin
 Paul Clerget : Le maire
 Fred Marche : Servières
 Jeanne Lory : L'hôtelière

References

Bibliography

External links

1932 films
French crime films
1930s French-language films
Maigret films
French black-and-white films
Police detective films
1932 crime films
1930s police procedural films
1930s French films